Freedom High School is a public high school located in the New Tampa region of Tampa, Florida, United States. It operates as a part of the Hillsborough County Public Schools district and serves students in grades 9–12.  Freedom High School was named in honor of those who lost their lives on September 11, 2001.

Demographics
Freedom High School is 33% Hispanic, 31% White, 26% Black, 5% Asian, 5% multiracial, and <1% other.

Media
Newspaper: Revolution http://fhsrevolution.com/
Web site: freedom.mysdhc.org
Yearbook: Glory
Media Specialist: Jennifer Simard

 TV Production: Freedom TV

Languages and language programs
 Bilingual: E.S.O.L.
 Foreign Language: Spanish and French.

Clubs
African American Studies
American Sign Language
Alternative Music
Book Club
Café Freedom
Drama
Engineering Club
English Honors Society
Environmental Club
FBLA
FFA
French Honor Society
Gay/Straight Alliance 
Interact Club
Key Club
K-Pop Club
Latino Dance Club
Marine Science Club
Model UN
Mu Alpha Theta
National Art Society
National Honor Society
Rho Kappa
NJROTC
Science National Honor Society
Scrubs Club
S-H-E Club
Spanish Honor Society
Spirit Club

Sports
Fall sports
Cross Country (B/G)
Football (B)
Golf (B/G)
Swimming (B/G)
Volleyball (G)

Winter sports
Basketball (B/G)
Ice Hockey (B/G)
Soccer (B/G)
Wrestling (B)

Spring sports
Baseball (B)
Lacrosse (B/G)
Flag Football (G)
Softball (G)
Tennis (B/G)
Track and Field (B/G)
FHS Athletic Director: Jeffery Duncan

School Ranking

Leadership
In June, 2008, principal Richard Bartels retired. Mr. Bartels was the first principal of Freedom High School and helped to open the school in 2002.

Kevin Stephenson actively serves as the current school principal since the 2014–2015 school year.

References

External links
Revolution
Fire At Freedom High Deemed Arson
Hillsborough County Public Schools

High schools in Hillsborough County, Florida
High schools in Tampa, Florida
Public high schools in Florida
2002 establishments in Florida
Educational institutions established in 2002